The Martyrs of Alexandria under Decius were a number of Christians (Julian, Eunos [Chronion], Beza, Justus, Macarius etc.) who were martyred in Alexandria, Egypt, under the Roman Emperor Decius (r. 249–251).
Their feast day is 30 October.

Great Synaxaristes

According to the Great Synaxaristes, the martyrs were Coïntas (Quintus), Mitras, Nemesion, Ptolemy, Theophilos, Igenis, Isidoros, Claudius, Epimachus, Eutropios, Zenon, Heron, Ammon, Atir, Besas, Dioskouros, Alexander, Cronion, Julian, Macarius and 13 other martyrs.
Coïntas (Quintus) and Mitras were tortured and then killed by having boiled lime poured over them; Nemesios and Ptolemy were cruelly tortured and ultimately beheaded; and of the remaining witnesses, some were burned alive and others were beheaded.

Monks of Ramsgate account

The monks of St Augustine's Abbey, Ramsgate wrote in their Book of Saints (1921),

Baring-Gould's account

Sabine Baring-Gould (1834–1924) in his Lives Of The Saints wrote under February 27,

Butler's account

The hagiographer Alban Butler (1710–1773) wrote in his Lives of the Fathers, Martyrs, and Other Principal Saints under February 27,

Notes

Sources

 
 
 

Saints from Roman Egypt
250 deaths